Edward McDonald (1876 – October 1938) was an English footballer who played at left half for Stoke, Burslem Port Vale, Notts County, and Portsmouth.

Career
McDonald played for Stoke, before joining Burslem Port Vale in July 1894. He made 19 Second Division appearances in the 1894–95 season, and scored his first senior goal on 24 December, in a 5–2 defeat to Newton Heath at the Athletic Ground. He played 30 games in the 1895–96 campaign, and scored in 4–0 home win over Rotherham Town and a 2–1 win over Newton Heath at Bank Street.

McDonald returned to Stoke in August 1896, after Vale failed to gain re-election to the Football League. He played two First Division games in the 1896–97 season, before leaving the Victoria Ground to return to Port Vale. After helping the Midland League club to lift the Staffordshire Senior Cup in 1898, he scored seven goals in 39 appearances in the 1898–99 season. He scored a hat-trick in a 4–1 victory over Luton Town on 4 March 1899. He played nine league games at the start of the 1899–1900 season, before he was sold to Notts County for a 'considerable' fee in November 1899, after Vale suffered a financial crisis. He later played for Portsmouth.

Career statistics
Source:

Honours
Port Vale
Staffordshire Senior Cup: 1898

References

1876 births
1938 deaths
Sportspeople from Newcastle-under-Lyme
English footballers
Association football wing halves
Stoke City F.C. players
Port Vale F.C. players
Notts County F.C. players
Portsmouth F.C. players
English Football League players
Midland Football League players
Southern Football League players
English Football League representative players